Séguy is a surname. Notable people with the surname include:
 Joseph Séguy (1689 in Rodez – 25 March 1761), French clergyman
 Eugène Séguy (1890 – 1 June 1985), French entomologist and artist who specialised in Diptera
 Jean Séguy (3 May 1925 – 11 September 2007), French sociologist of religions

See also 
Seguy a surname
Seguí (surname)

Surnames of French origin